Keith Frank is an American zydeco musician from Louisiana, United States. Frank started his band, The Soileau Zydeco Band, in 1990 and is active as of 2016. He is the son of accordion player Preston Frank.

Frank records on Soulwood Records.

Discography

Studio albums and EP
What's His Name? (1994) (Maison de Soul)
Movin' On Up (1995) (Maison de Soul)
Only the Strong Survive (1996) (Maison de Soul)
You'd Be Surprised (1997) (Maison de Soul)
On A Mission (1998) (Maison de Soul)
Ready or Not (2000) (Shanachie)
The Masked Band (2001)
Keith Frank EP (2002) (Maison de Soul)The Zydeco Icon (2003) (Soulwood Records)Going to See Keith Frank (2005) (Soulwood Records)Undisputed (2007) (Soulwood Records)To Be Perfectly Frank (2007) (Soulwood Records)Loved.Feared.Respected (2008) (Soulwood Records)Follow the Leader (2012) (Soulwood Records)One Night At Cowboy's (2017) (Soulwood Records)Return Of The King (2018) (Soulwood Records)

Live albumsLive At Slim's Y-Ki-Ki (1999) (Shanachie)Live At Slims Yi Ki Ki, Vol. II'' (2014) (Soulwood Records)

References

Zydeco musicians
1972 births
Living people
Place of birth missing (living people)
Musicians from Louisiana
McNeese State University alumni
Shanachie Records artists
Maison de Soul Records artists